Angela Perez Flores is a Guamanian former First Lady of Guam.

Early life 
In 1900, Flores was born in Guam.

Career 
In 1960, when Joseph Flores was appointed by President Dwight D. Eisenhower as the Governor of Guam, Flores became the First Lady of Guam on July 9, 1960, until May 20, 1961.

Personal life 
Flores' husband was Joseph Flores, a Guamanian newspaper publisher, founder of the Guam Daily News (Pacific Daily News), banker, co-founder of Guam Savings and Loan (present day BankPacific), and Governor of Guam. They had one child, Edward. Flores and her family lived in San Francisco, California. In 1947, Flores and her family moved back to Guam.

Flores' grandson Philip J. Flores became a banker and businessman. He is the Chairman, President and CEO of BankPacific. He is also the Chairman and President of Our Lady of Peace Memorial Gardens Inc. He is also involved in business in the industrial laundry, recycling and solid waste handling industries.

In 1982, Flores died in Agana, Guam. Flores is interred at Our Lady of Peace Memorial Gardens in Yona, Guam.

References 

First Ladies and Gentlemen of Guam
Guamanian Republicans
Guamanian women